The St. Marys Oracle is a newspaper serving St Marys, West Virginia, and surrounding Pleasants County. Published weekly, it has a circulation of 2,006 and is owned by West Central Publishing Inc.

The paper was established in 1877 as the Democratic weekly The Observer by M. P. Prettyman, who bought the printing plant of the failed West Virginia Methodist Protestant. Prettyman, a schoolteacher who had developed an interest in typography, taught himself over a series of weekends to set type and run the press. He would later change the paper's to The Oracle in 1881.

The paper passed through a number of owner's before becoming R. A. Gallagher purchased it and changed the name to the St Marys Oracle in 1885.  For a period of 15 years Gallagher ran it, selling a half interest to Robert L. Pemberton in 1902 who managed it from that time forward, buying the full interest in 1909.

By 1920 it had a paid circulation of 1,000.

In 2003, the paper sued the Pleasants school board, claiming it had violated the state's Sunshine Laws by not providing adequate details in a meeting where layoffs were proposed. The two parties were able to resolve the lawsuit out of court, with the paper agreeing that the omission had been unintentional.

Related Resources
 List of newspapers in West Virginia

References

Newspapers published in West Virginia